William Buckner or Bucknor (?–1700) was a minor Anglo-Irish politician of the late 17th century.

Buckner was returned for the Dungarvan borough of County Waterford to the Irish House of Commons for two terms, serving from 1692 to 1699. He was a lawyer and attorney and was one of a number of Irish subjects proscribed by James II during the Glorious Revolution in 1689. From his 1700 will, in which he calls himself "William Bucknor of Coolefin" (preserved in abstract form by Betham), he appears to have been one of the sons of John Bucknor of Dromore, an "English Protestant" Royalist who had been a client of the influential FitzGeralds of Dromana. One of the last of them, Sir John FitzGerald (d. 1664), had previously held one of Dungarvan's seats in the Irish Parliament in the 1660s.

References

 https://web.archive.org/web/20090601105535/http://www.leighrayment.com/commons/irelandcommons.htm

1700 deaths
Irish MPs 1692–1693
Irish MPs 1695–1699
Members of the Parliament of Ireland (pre-1801) for County Waterford constituencies